Birth or parturition is the act or process of bearing or bringing forth offspring.

Birth may also refer to:
 Childbirth, birth in humans
 Birth (journal), a medical journal for childbirth research
 Birth (1984 film), a 1984 anime film
 Birth (2004 film), a 2004 film starring Nicole Kidman
 Birth (Keith Jarrett album) (1971)
 "Birth" (KAT-TUN song)
 Birth (The Peddlers song)
 Birth (American Horror Story), an episode of American Horror Story
 Kamen Rider Birth, a character in Japanese drama Kamen Rider OOO
 Arm of Kannon or Birth, a manga
 Birth, a 1917 documentary film by Alfred C. Abadie and Alfred Warman

See also 
 Berth (disambiguation)